Uruguayans in Cuba are people born in Uruguay who live in Cuba, or Cuban-born people of Uruguayan descent. .

During the civic-military dictatorship of Uruguay (1973-1985) several Uruguayans went into exile in Cuba.

Notable people 
past
 Mario Benedetti (1920-2009), poet and writer
 Atahualpa del Cioppo (1904-1993), playwright
 Dahd Sfeir (1932-2015), actress
 Vladimir Turiansky (1927-2015), Communist politician and trade unionist
present
 Daniel Chavarria (born 1933), revolutionary and writer

See also

Cubans in Uruguay
Cuba–Uruguay relations
Emigration from Uruguay

References

Ethnic groups in Cuba
 
 
Cuba